42nd Street most commonly refers to:
42nd Street (Manhattan), a major crosstown street in the New York City borough of Manhattan

It may also refer to:
42nd Street (film), a 1933 American Warner Bros. musical film with lyrics by Al Dubin, and music by Harry Warren
42nd Street, a 1932 novel by Bradford Ropes which was adapted for the 1933 film and subsequent musical
"42nd Street" (song), title song from the film
42nd Street (musical), a 1980 musical with a book by Michael Stewart and Mark Bramble

New York City Subway
Times Square–42nd Street/Port Authority Bus Terminal station, a station complex consisting of:
Times Square – 42nd Street (IRT Broadway – Seventh Avenue Line); serving the  trains
Times Square – 42nd Street (BMT Broadway Line); serving the  trains
Times Square (IRT 42nd Street Shuttle); the northern terminal of the  train
Times Square (IRT Flushing Line), serving the  trains
42nd Street – Port Authority Bus Terminal (IND Eighth Avenue Line), serving the  trains
42nd Street–Bryant Park/Fifth Avenue station, a station complex consisting of:
42nd Street – Bryant Park (IND Sixth Avenue Line), serving the  trains
Fifth Avenue (IRT Flushing Line), serving the  trains
Grand Central–42nd Street station, a station complex consisting of:
Grand Central (IRT 42nd Street Shuttle), the southern terminal of the  train
Grand Central – 42nd Street (IRT Lexington Avenue Line); serving the  trains
Grand Central (IRT Flushing Line), serving the  trains
42nd Street station (IRT Second Avenue Line), demolished station of the Second Avenue elevated
42nd Street station (IRT Third Avenue Line), demolished station of the Third Avenue elevated
42nd Street station (IRT Sixth Avenue Line), demolished station of the Sixth Avenue elevated
42nd Street station (IRT Ninth Avenue Line), demolished station of the Ninth Avenue elevated
42nd Street (IND Second Avenue Line), planned station of the Second Avenue subway

The IRT Flushing Line and IRT 42nd Street Shuttle run under 42nd Street in Manhattan.